is a passenger railway station on the Yokohama Line located in the city of Machida, Tokyo, Japan, operated by the East Japan Railway Company (JR East).

Lines

Station layout
The station consists of two side platforms serving two tracks.

Platforms

History
The station opened on 23 September 1908. With the privatization of Japanese National Railways (JNR) on 1 April 1987, the station came under the control of JR East.

Station numbering was introduced on 20 August 2016 with Aihara being assigned station number JH29.

Passenger statistics
In fiscal 2019, the station was used by an average of 10,407 passengers daily (boarding passengers only).

Surrounding area
Machida City Sakai City Center
Machida City Sakai Library
Machida City Aihara Elementary School
Machida City Sakai Junior High School

See also
 List of railway stations in Japan

References

External links

 JR East station information 

Railway stations in Japan opened in 1908
Railway stations in Tokyo
Yokohama Line
Stations of East Japan Railway Company
Machida, Tokyo